Silja Anna Skulstad Urang (born 6 January 2000) is a Norwegian competitive figure skater. She is the 2020 Norwegian Champion. She is also the 2019 Norwegian Junior silver medalist.

Programs

References 

2000 births
Sportspeople from Bergen
Norwegian female single skaters
Living people
21st-century Norwegian women